Yanacachi is a location in the La Paz Department in Bolivia. It is the seat of the Yanacachi Municipality, the third municipal section of the Sud Yungas Province.

References 

Populated places in La Paz Department (Bolivia)